Bill and Hillary Clinton National Airport , also known as Adams Field, is a joint civil-military airport on the east side of Little Rock, Arkansas. It is operated by the Little Rock Municipal Airport Commission.

The largest commercial airport in Arkansas, it served more than 2.1 million passengers in the year spanning from March 2009 through to February 2010. While Clinton National Airport does not have direct international passenger flights, more than 50 flights arrive or depart at Little Rock each day, with nonstop service to 14 cities. The airport is included in the Federal Aviation Administration (FAA) National Plan of Integrated Airport Systems for 2019–2023, in which it is categorized as a small-hub primary commercial service facility.

History

The airport was originally named Adams Field after Captain George Geyer Adams, 154th Observation Squadron, Arkansas National Guard, who was killed in the line of duty on September 4, 1937. He was a strong advocate for the airport, and also a Little Rock city councilor.

American Airlines was the first airline to serve Little Rock when it first landed at Adams Field on June 19, 1931.

During World War II the airfield was used by the United States Army Air Forces Third Air Force for antisubmarine patrols and training.

In 1972 the airport opened its current 12-gate terminal.

In August 2008, the airport approved a plan to renovate the terminal over a 15-year period. This would expand the terminal from 12 to 16 gates.

On March 20, 2012, the municipal airport commission voted to rename the airport the Bill and Hillary Clinton National Airport, named after Arkansas native, former Governor and United States President Bill Clinton and his wife, United States Secretary of State Hillary Clinton. The name Adams Field will continue to be used when referring to the airport's runways and air traffic, and will be the airport's official designator. In 2017, Republican state Sen. Jason Rapert filed a bill that would have forced the airport's renaming but relented when he found little support for the measure.

In October 2013, Travel + Leisure released a survey of travelers that ranked Clinton National Airport as the worst of the 67 domestic airports considered in the survey. The survey report cited long lines and few food and shopping choices, among other criticisms. A survey commissioned by the airport contradicted Travel + Leisures claim, finding that more than 90% of passengers were satisfied with their experience.

Facilities and aircraft

Clinton National Airport covers 2,000 acres (809 ha) at an elevation of 266 feet (81 m) above mean sea level. It has three concrete runways: 4L/22R is 8,273 by 150 feet (2,522 x 46 m); 4R/22L is 8,251 by 150 feet (2,515 x 46 m); 18/36 is 6,224 by 150 feet (1,897 x 46 m). It has one concrete helipad 50 by 50 feet (15 x 15 m).

In the year ending February 28, 2021, the airport had 61,278 aircraft operations, an average of 168 per day: 44% general aviation, 25% scheduled commercial, 17% military, and 13% air taxi. The military operations are mostly C-130 transports from nearby Little Rock Air Force Base practicing touch-and-go landings. At the time, 125 aircraft were based at this airport: 38 single-engine, 34 multi-engine, 49 jet, and 4 helicopter.

Dassault Aircraft Services (DAS), a subsidiary of Dassault Aviation, operates a large facility at the airport. It is the site of two Falcon aircraft operations: the main Completion Center for all Falcon jets worldwide, and the company-owned Service Center.
Current production model Falcons are manufactured in France, then flown in "green" condition to the Completion Center where optional avionics and custom interiors are installed, and exteriors are painted. Dassault Aircraft Services (DAS) – Little Rock provides inspection, maintenance, modification, completion and repair needs for the Falcon product line.

Terminal
The single terminal has 12 gates. Six gates are along the length of the terminal (three on either side) and a rotunda at the end has six more.

Airlines and destinations

Passenger

Cargo

Statistics

Top destinations

Accidents and incidents
 On January 19, 1990, an Eastman Kodak Grumman Gulfstream II crashed during final approach to Little Rock National Airport; all seven on board were killed. Unfavorable weather conditions and pilot error contributed to the accident.
 On June 1, 1999, American Airlines Flight 1420, a McDonnell Douglas MD-82 with 145 passengers and crew, attempting to land in a severe thunderstorm, overran the end of runway 4R, crashed through a fence and down a rock embankment into a flood plain; one crewmember and ten passengers were killed.
 On February 22, 2023, a Beechcraft Super King Air took off during gusty winds and heavy rain. Shortly after takeoff, the plane crashed near a 3M plant, killing all 5 on board. The passengers were members of an environmental firm called CTEH enroute to investigate an explosion at a metal factory in Bedford, Ohio.

Notes

See also
 List of airports in Arkansas

References

External links

 Government
 
 General information
 Aerial image as of March 2001 from USGS The National Map
 
 
 
 

1931 establishments in Arkansas
Airfields of the United States Army Air Forces Air Transport Command in North America
Airfields of the United States Army Air Forces in Arkansas
Airports established in 1931
Airports in Arkansas
Government buildings in Little Rock, Arkansas
Transportation in Little Rock, Arkansas